Sirkka Liisa Lekman (née Manninen; born 13 September 1944 in Laukaa) is a Finnish secondary school teacher and politician. She was a member of the Parliament of Finland from 1998 to 1999, representing the National Coalition Party.

References

1944 births
Living people
People from Laukaa
National Coalition Party politicians
Members of the Parliament of Finland (1995–99)
Women members of the Parliament of Finland